Arturo Moreno (10 May 1909 – 25 June 1993) was a Spanish cartoonist, comics artist and animator.

His family moved to Barcelona when he was eight. Moreno began working as a professional artist in the 1920s, contributing to a satirical magazine, Pulgarcito.

In 1942, Moreno founded Diarmo Films with José María Arola. "Diarmo" is a portmanteau of "Dibujos animados Arola y Moreno" (Spanish for "Arola and Moreno Animations").

In 1948, he emigrated to Caracas, Venezuela and worked for the Venezuelan Ministry of Education on Tricolor, an educational children's magazine, as well as advertising spots. Moreno returned to Spain in 1956.

He was known as one of the most prominent Spanish animators.

Biography 
After moving to Barcelona, Moreno began taking drawing classes. After working as a comic strip artist, he began drawing for Pulgarcito and another magazine, TBO, in 1924. In 1929, he had his first exhibition. At this point, he began to take an interested in animation, after seeing movies featuring Felix the cat. His debut was a one-minute black-and-white commercial for a chocolate company.

Works

Cine

Notes

References

Bibliography
 
 

1909 births
1993 deaths
Spanish animators
Spanish animated film directors
Spanish comics artists
People from Valencia